Balázs Farkas (born 2 November 1978 in Budapest) is a Hungarian football player who currently plays for Diósgyőri VTK.

References
HLSZ 

1978 births
Living people
Footballers from Budapest
Hungarian footballers
Association football goalkeepers
Budapesti VSC footballers
FC Sopron players
Rákospalotai EAC footballers
Olympiacos Volos F.C. players
Pécsi MFC players
FC Felcsút players
Szolnoki MÁV FC footballers
Digenis Akritas Morphou FC players
Diósgyőri VTK players
Hungarian expatriate footballers
Expatriate footballers in Greece
Expatriate footballers in Cyprus
Hungarian expatriate sportspeople in Greece
Hungarian expatriate sportspeople in Cyprus
21st-century Hungarian people